The 1963 Far East Circuit was the second season of golf tournaments that comprised the Far East Circuit, later known as the Asia Golf Circuit.

The circuit consisted of five tournaments over six weeks, and was formed from the national open championships of the Philippines, Singapore, Malaysia and Hong Kong along with the Yomiuri Shimbun sponsored Yomiuri International in Tokyo, Japan. A new tournament was scheduled to be held in Osaka, Japan, in the week between Hong Kong and Tokyo, but it was cancelled due to the course being covered in snow.

Australian Kel Nagle was the overall circuit champion.

Schedule
The table below shows the 1963 Far East Circuit schedule.

Final standings
In a change from the inaugural season, the Far East Circuit standings were based on a points system.

References

Far East Circuit
Asia Golf Circuit